Thomas William Bradshaw (born 27 July 1992) is a Welsh professional footballer who plays as a striker for Championship club Millwall. He has previously played for Aberystwyth Town, Shrewsbury Town, Walsall and Barnsley. Born in England, he represented Wales at under−19 and under−21 level before making his senior Wales debut in March 2016.

Club career

Shrewsbury Town
Bradshaw started his career at Aberystwyth Town and was signed by Shrewsbury Town in May 2009 (Aberystwyth later received a retrospective fee of £30,000 under the FIFA training compensation scheme). He made his debut in a League Two match against Crewe Alexandra at Gresty Road on 10 April 2010, replacing Jamie Cureton for the final 15 minutes and scoring two goals in a 3–0 win. At the end of the 2009–10 season he signed a two-year professional contract.

Despite scoring six goals in the 2010–11 season, Bradshaw found first team opportunities more limited in 2011–12, making only 8 appearances and scoring once against Accrington Stanley.

Bradshaw was handed the number nine shirt for the 2012–13 campaign, in which he made 22 appearances, mostly as a substitute, but failed to score. He signed a contract extension of an undisclosed length on 23 May 2013 and scored his first senior goal for nearly two years in a 2–0 home win over Swindon Town on 17 August.

Walsall
On 23 June 2014, Bradshaw signed a two-year contract with League One side Walsall for an undisclosed fee, believed to be in the region of £50,000, following the relegation of Shrewsbury Town to League Two. He scored his first goal for the Saddlers on his debut for the club on 9 August 2014 against Port Vale in a 1–1 away draw. Bradshaw injured his hamstring in a 1–1 draw with Bristol City on 4 October 2014, which sidelined him for most of the month. He also scored a last–minute equaliser in a 2–2 draw against his former side Shrewsbury in the FA Cup first round on 8 November 2014. Bradshaw enjoyed a prolific start to the season and scored his tenth goal of the campaign in all competitions in a 3–1 win against Barnsley on 13 December 2014.

Bradshaw scored Walsall's second goal in their 2–0 victory over Preston North End in the first leg of the Football League Trophy Northern area final on 7 January 2015. He started in the final on 22 March, Walsall's first match at Wembley Stadium, a 0–2 defeat to Bristol City. On 24 June, he extended his contract until the end of the 2016–17 season.

Bradshaw scored his first career hat-trick on 11 August 2015 in a 4–3 win at Championship side Nottingham Forest in the first round of the League Cup, finishing with an added-time penalty.

After making his international debut for Wales, and Walsall subsequently losing to Barnsley in the League One play-off semi-final, Bradshaw requested to be placed on the transfer list in July 2016.

Barnsley
After his transfer request was accepted by the Saddlers, Bradshaw joined newly promoted Championship club Barnsley for an undisclosed fee on 14 July. He scored his first goal for the Reds in a 4–0 win against Rotherham United on 27 August 2016. He scored eight times in his first season and in 2017–18 he was the club's top scorer with 12 goals, as they were relegated. On 7 April 2018, he scored a later winner in a 3–2 win over South Yorkshire rivals at Sheffield United at Oakwell; it was only his club's second win in 14 games.

Millwall
On 23 August 2018, Bradshaw joined Millwall initially on loan until January, when the deal became permanent. He signed a "long-term contract" of undisclosed length, and the fee broke Millwall's record of £800,000 paid for Paul Goddard in 1989. His season ended in November after ten goalless appearances, with a knee ligament injury against Brentford.

Bradshaw scored his first goal for the Lions on 13 August 2019 in an EFL Cup first round game away to West Bromwich Albion, equalising in a 2–1 win. Eleven days later he recorded a first league goal with his first touch after coming on, to earn a 1–1 draw at Middlesbrough. In October, he scored five goals across four consecutive games, ending with both of a draw with Cardiff City at The New Den. He won the Championship Player of the Month award for February 2023 after scoring five goals.

International career
Although he was born in Shrewsbury, Shropshire, Bradshaw grew up in Tywyn, Gwynedd, and attended Ysgol Penglais School in Aberystwyth, thus qualified to play for Wales. He was called up to the Wales under−19 squad for the first time in September 2010, scoring on his debut during a 2–0 win over Liechtenstein. He scored again in a 3–3 draw with Turkey on 20 October 2010. He was called into the Wales under−21 squad in September 2011 for the away game with Montenegro, scoring on his debut.

Bradshaw was capped eight times for the Wales U−21 squad, making his last appearance as a substitute against Moldova U−21s on 10 September 2013. He opted to withdraw from the squad when called up a month later in order to remain available for first-team duties with Shrewsbury Town. This effectively ended his international youth career, with under−21s manager Geraint Williams indicating he would not select him again, although Bradshaw was in any case in his last few months of eligibility for the under−21 squad.

A year later, Bradshaw was put on the standby list for the senior Wales national football team for the Euro 2016 qualifying matches against Bosnia & Herzegovina and Cyprus in October 2014, but had to withdraw due to picking up a hamstring injury in a match against Bristol City for new club Walsall. On 4 November 2015 he was called up to the senior squad for a friendly against the Netherlands, and was an unused substitute in a 3–2 defeat. He made his debut the following 28 March, replacing Tom Lawrence for the final 17 minutes of a 1–0 friendly loss to Ukraine in Kyiv. Bradshaw was in Chris Coleman's provisional squad for the final tournament, but withdrew due to a calf injury.

Career statistics

Club

Honours
Wales
China Cup runner-up: 2018

Individual
Championship Player of the Month: February 2023

References

External links
Tom Bradshaw profile at the Shrewsbury Town website
Tom Bradshaw Welsh Premier League career stats

1992 births
Living people
Sportspeople from Shrewsbury
Footballers from Shropshire
English footballers
Welsh footballers
Wales youth international footballers
Wales under-21 international footballers
Wales international footballers
Association football forwards
Aberystwyth Town F.C. players
Shrewsbury Town F.C. players
Walsall F.C. players
Barnsley F.C. players
Millwall F.C. players
Cymru Premier players
English Football League players
People educated at Ysgol Penglais School
Welsh people of English descent